The 2011 Legg Mason Tennis Classic was a men's tennis tournament played on outdoor hard courts. It was the 43rd edition of this event and was part of the ATP World Tour 500 series of the 2011 ATP World Tour. It took place at the William H.G. FitzGerald Tennis Center in Washington, D.C. in the United States from July 30 through August 7, 2011. Unseeded Radek Štěpánek won the singles title.

Finals

Singles

 Radek Štěpánek defeated  Gaël Monfils, 6–4, 6–4
 It was Stepanek's 1st title of the year and 5th of his career.

Doubles

 Michaël Llodra /  Nenad Zimonjić defeated  Robert Lindstedt /  Horia Tecău, 6–7(3–7), 7–6(8–6), [10–7]

Entrants

Seeds

 Seedings are based on rankings as of July 25, 2011.

Other entrants
The following players received wildcards into the singles main draw
  Ryan Harrison
  Denis Kudla
  Gaël Monfils
  Fernando Verdasco

The following players received entry from the qualifying draw:

  Matthew Ebden
  Chris Guccione
  Marinko Matosevic
  Rajeev Ram
  Artem Sitak
  Tim Smyczek

The following players received entry as lucky losers into the singles main draw:
  Amer Delić
  Wayne Odesnik

References

External links
Official website

2011 ATP World Tour
2011
2011 in sports in Washington, D.C.